Anjahambe is a town and commune in Madagascar. It belongs to the district of Vavatenina, which is a part of Analanjirofo Region. The population of the commune was estimated to be approximately 12,000 in 2001 commune census.

Primary and junior level secondary education are available in town. The majority 90% of the population of the commune are farmers, while an additional 5% receives their livelihood from raising livestock. The most important crops are rice and bananas, while other important agricultural products are coffee, cloves and vanilla.  Services provide employment for 5% of the population.

Roads
The RN 22 leads from Anjahambe to Fenoarivo Atsinanana (Fénérive).

References and notes 

Populated places in Analanjirofo